The following lists events that happened in 1994 in Libya.

Incumbents
 President: Muammar al-Gaddafi
 Prime Minister: Abuzed Omar Dorda (until 29 January), Abdul Majid al-Qa′ud (starting 29 January)

Events
1994–95 Libyan Premier League

References

 
Years of the 20th century in Libya
Libya
Libya
1990s in Libya